In ancient Athens, Eleos (Ancient Greek  m.) or Elea was the personification of mercy, clemency, compassion and pity – the counterpart of the Roman goddess Clementia. Pausanias described her as "among all the gods the most useful to human life in all its vicissitudes."

Family 
Eleos was the daughter of the primordial gods, Nyx (Night) and Erebus (Darkness)."From Nox/ Nyx (Night) and Erebus [were born]: Fatum/ Moros (Fate), Senectus/ Geras (Old Age), Mors/ Thanatos (Death), Letum (Dissolution), Continentia (Moderation), Somnus/ Hypnos (Sleep), Somnia/ Oneiroi (Dreams), Amor (Love)--that is Lysimeles, Epiphron (Prudence), Porphyrion, Epaphus, Discordia/ Eris (Discord), Miseria/ Oizys (Misery), Petulantia/ Hybris (Wantonness), Nemesis (Envy), Euphrosyne (Good Cheer), Amicitia/ Philotes (Friendship), Misericordia/ Eleos (Compassion), Styx (Hatred); the three Parcae/ Moirai (Fates), namely Clotho, Lachesis and Atropos; the Hesperides."

Mythology 
Pausanias states that there was an altar in Athens dedicated to Eleos, at which children of Heracles sought refuge from Eurystheus' prosecution. Adrastus also came to this altar after the defeat of the Seven against Thebes, praying that those who died in the battle be buried. Eleos was only recognized in Athens, where she was honored by the cutting of hair and the undressing of garments at the altar.

Statius in Thebaid (1st century) describes the altar to Clementia in Athens (treating Eleos as feminine based on the grammatical gender in Latin):  "There was in the midst of the city [of Athens] an altar belonging to no god of power; gentle Clementia (Clemency) [Eleos] had there her seat, and the wretched made it sacred".

See also

 (Goddesses of Justice):  Astraea, Dike, Themis, Prudentia
 (Goddesses of Injustice):  Adikia
 (Aspects of Justice):  (see also: Triple deity/Triple Goddess (Neopaganism))
 (Justice) Themis/Dike/Justitia (Lady Justice), Raguel (the Angel of Justice)
 (Retribution) Nemesis/Rhamnousia/Rhamnusia/Adrasteia/Adrestia/Invidia
 (Redemption) Eleos/Soteria/Clementia, Zadkiel/Zachariel (the Angel of Mercy)

Notes

References 

 Apollodorus, The Library with an English Translation by Sir James George Frazer, F.B.A., F.R.S. in 2 Volumes, Cambridge, MA, Harvard University Press; London, William Heinemann Ltd. 1921. ISBN 0-674-99135-4. Online version at the Perseus Digital Library. Greek text available from the same website.
 Gaius Julius Hyginus, Fabulae from The Myths of Hyginus translated and edited by Mary Grant. University of Kansas Publications in Humanistic Studies. Online version at the Topos Text Project.
Pausanias, Description of Greece with an English Translation by W.H.S. Jones, Litt.D., and H.A. Ormerod, M.A., in 4 Volumes. Cambridge, MA, Harvard University Press; London, William Heinemann Ltd. 1918. . Online version at the Perseus Digital Library
 Pausanias, Graeciae Descriptio. 3 vols. Leipzig, Teubner. 1903.  Greek text available at the Perseus Digital Library.

Greek gods
Personifications in Greek mythology
Women in Greek mythology
Children of Nyx